Anthoula "Anthi" Balta (born October 1, 1987) is a Greek professional basketball player who plays for Olympiacos in the Greek Women's Basketball League.

References

External links 
 Hellenic Basketball Federation player profile (Greek)
 Eurobasket.com profile

Living people
Greek women's basketball players
Olympiacos Women's Basketball players
1987 births
Guards (basketball)
Basketball players from Athens